Yante Khaaliq Daiyann Maten (born August 14, 1996) is an American professional basketball player for San-en NeoPhoenix of the Japanese B.League. He played college basketball for the University of Georgia. A 6’7” power forward from Pontiac, Michigan, Maten won SEC Player of the Year by the Associated Press as a senior.

College career
After starring at Lahser High School for three years until its closure in 2013, and then in the 2013–14 season at its successor, Bloomfield Hills High School, Maten surprised recruiting experts by selecting Georgia over Indiana and home state school Michigan State.

After a breakout sophomore year where he was named second-team All-Southeastern Conference (SEC) by the league's coaches, Maten enjoyed a strong individual junior season, marred by a knee injury and the Bulldogs’ mediocre 19–14 record. After averaging 18.2 points and 6.8 rebounds per game, he was named first-team All-SEC by the leagues’ coaches and second-team by the Associated Press. He was also named as a finalist for the Kareem Abdul-Jabbar Award for the nation's top center (despite starting the season on the watch list for the Karl Malone Award for top power forward).

Following his junior season, Maten declared his eligibility for the 2017 NBA draft without an agent, leaving open the possibility of returning to Georgia for his senior year. Ultimately, after working out for NBA teams he decided to return to Georgia for his senior year to improve his draft position.

Prior to the start of the 2017–18 season, Maten was named the preseason SEC co-Player of the Year (with Texas A&M forward Robert Williams and incoming Missouri freshman Michael Porter Jr.). After a strong start to the season, Maten was named to the John R. Wooden Award midseason top 25 watch list on January 10, one of only two SEC players to be so recognized. Maten won SEC Player of the Year by the Associated Press and was named to the All-SEC First Team.

Professional career

Miami Heat (2018–2019)
After not being selected in the 2018 NBA draft, Maten signed a two-way contract with the Miami Heat of the National Basketball Association (NBA) on July 29, 2018. Under the terms of the deal, he split his time between the Heat and their NBA G League affiliate, the Sioux Falls Skyforce. On December 2, 2018, Maten scored a career-high 42 points to go along with 14 rebounds and 3 blocks in a 113-108 win over the Stockton Kings. Maten was named NBA G League Player of the Month for December 2018. On April 7, 2019, the Heat signed Maten to a standard NBA contract. On July 29, 2019, Maten was waived by the Miami Heat.

Maine Red Claws (2019–2020)
On September 17, 2019, Maten was reported to have signed with the Boston Celtics. On October 20, 2019, Maten was reported to have waived by the Celtics. On October 26, 2019, Maten was included in the training camp roster of the Maine Red Claws.

Wonju DB Promy (2020–2021) 
Maten joined Wonju DB Promy of the Korean Basketball League for the 2020–21 season.

Hapoel Tel Aviv (2022) 
On April 23, 2022, he has signed with Hapoel Tel Aviv of the Israeli Premier League.

Career statistics

Professional

| style="text-align:left;"| 2018–19
| style="text-align:left;"| Sioux Falls Skyforce
| NBA G League
| 30 || 32.7 || .539 || .327 || .777 || 9.6 || 1.8 || .8 || 1.1 || 23.5
|-
| style="text-align:left;"| 
| style="text-align:left;"| Miami Heat
| NBA
| 2 || 6.5 || .250 || .000|| .000 || 1.5 || .0 || .5 || .0 || 1.0
|-
| style="text-align:left;"| 2019–20
| style="text-align:left;"| Maine Red Claws
| NBA G League
| 39 || 28.8 || .545 || .247 || .712 || 8.8 || 1.8 || 1.0 || .8 || 18.1
|- class="sortbottom"
| style="text-align:center;" colspan="2"| Career
| All Leagues
| 71 || 29.8 || .541 || .291 || .754 || 9.0 || 1.8 || .9 || .9 || 19.9

College

|-
| style="text-align:left;"| 2014–15
| style="text-align:left;"| Georgia
| 32 || 2 || 18.2 || .416 || .000 || .648 || 4.3 || .3 || .3 || 1.4 || 5.0
|-
| style="text-align:left;"| 2015–16
| style="text-align:left;"| Georgia
| 34 || 34 || 30.0 || .496 || .533 || .783 || 8.0 || .8 || .3 || 1.8 || 16.5
|-
| style="text-align:left;"| 2016–17
| style="text-align:left;"| Georgia
| 29 || 28 || 29.0 || .519 || .488 || .716 || 6.8 || 1.5 || .7 || 1.5 || 18.2
|-
| style="text-align:left;"| 2017–18
| style="text-align:left;"| Georgia
| 33 || 33 || 34.3 || .464 || .341 || .801 || 8.6 || 1.5 || .5 || 1.5 || 19.3
|- class="sortbottom"
| style="text-align:center;" colspan="2"| Career
| 128 || 97 || 27.9 || .483 || .403 || .755 || 6.9 || 1.0 || .4 || 1.6 || 14.7

References

External links
Georgia Bulldogs bio
College stats @ Sports-reference.com

1996 births
Living people
American men's basketball players
Basketball players from Michigan
Centers (basketball)
Georgia Bulldogs basketball players
Maine Red Claws players
Miami Heat players
Power forwards (basketball)
Sioux Falls Skyforce players
Sportspeople from Pontiac, Michigan
Undrafted National Basketball Association players
United States men's national basketball team players